Paul Rigaumont (16 February 1920 – 20 October 1960) was a Belgian water polo player. He competed in the men's tournament at the 1948 Summer Olympics.

References

External links
 

1920 births
1960 deaths
Belgian male water polo players
Olympic water polo players of Belgium
Water polo players at the 1948 Summer Olympics
Place of birth missing
20th-century Belgian people